Aleksandr Yuryevich Sautin (born 30 January 1988) is a Russian professional football player who plays for FC SKA Rostov-on-Don.

Club career
He made his Russian Football National League debut for FC Metallurg-Kuzbass Novokuznetsk on 10 July 2012 in a game against FC Neftekhimik Nizhnekamsk.

Honours
Club
FNL Cup:2019
Individual
 Russian Second Division, Zone Ural-Povolzhye best goalkeeper: 2010.
FNL Cup Best Goalkeaper: 2019

References

External links
 

1988 births
Footballers from Moscow
Living people
Russian footballers
Association football goalkeepers
FC Fakel Voronezh players
FC Lokomotiv Moscow players
FC Avangard Kursk players
FC Novokuznetsk players
FC SKA Rostov-on-Don players
Russian First League players
Russian Second League players